The Dynasty of Dunnum, sometimes called the Theogony of Dunnum or Dunnu or the Harab Myth, is an ancient Mesopotamian mythical tale of successive generations of gods who take power through parricide and live incestuously with their mothers and/or sisters, until, according to a reconstruction of the broken text, more acceptable behavior prevailed with the last generation of gods, Enlil and his twin sons Nušku and Ninurta, who share rule amicably. It is extant in a sole-surviving late Babylonian copy excavated from the site of the ancient city of Sippar by Hormuzd Rassam in the 19th century.

Synopsis

It chronicles the conflict of generations of the gods who represent aspects of fertility, agriculture and the seasonal cycle: heaven, earth, sea, river, plough, wild and domesticated animals, herdsman, pasture, fruit-tree and vine.

It begins, according to a restoration:

Then Sumuqan kills his father Harab (plough), marries his mother Ki (earth) and his sister and the cycle of carnage begins. The city of Dunnum was a synonymous toponym, with many places so named, such as one in the vicinity of Isin and another lying of the right bank of the Euphrates in what is now northern Syria. A dunnu is a fortified settlement, but the word can also be translated as strength or violence.

Influence

The tale spread across to Phoenicia and over the Aegean Sea, where its influence can be felt in the Ugarit myth Ba’al and Yam from the Ba’al cycle (ca. 1600-1200 BC), the Hittite myth Song of Kumarbi (14th or 13th century BC) and the Greek poet Hesiod’s Theogony (ca. 800-700 BC).

References

19th-century archaeological discoveries
Mesopotamian myths
Akkadian literature
Sippar
Archaeological discoveries in Iraq